Emmanuel William Oluwarotimi Adebowale (born 19 September 1997) is an English professional footballer who last played as a defender for  club Crawley Town.

Adebowale started his career at West Ham United, before continuing his development at Sheffield United. He has played non-league football for Sheffield, Goole, Hayes & Yeading United, Bishop's Stortford, Dover Athletic, Bognor Regis Town and Eastbourne Borough. In January 2020, he signed a two-and-a-half year deal with League Two club Crawley Town. He spent the first half of the 2021–22 season on loan at Havant & Waterlooville.

Career
Born in Stratford, Adebowale was part of the youth setup at West Ham United before joining Sheffield United on a two-year scholarship in 2014. During 2015–16 season, he spent time on loan at Sheffield and Goole.

Following his scholarship at Sheffield United, Adebowale joined Hayes & Yeading United in September 2016 before leaving later that season to join Bishop's Stortford.

On 27 July 2017, Adebowale signed for National League side Dover Athletic on a two-year deal. He joined Bognor Regis Town on a one-month loan in January 2018. On 30 November 2018, he joined Eastbourne Borough on a one-month loan. After his contract at Dover expired, Adebowale joined National League South side Eastbourne Borough on 6 June 2019.

On 31 January 2020, Adebowale signed for EFL League Two club Crawley Town for an undisclosed fee. He made his debut for Crawley Town on 8 February 2020, starting in an away game against Salford City – his only Crawley appearance of the 2019–20 season.

On 12 August 2021, he joined National League South club Havant & Waterlooville on a one-year loan deal. He made his debut for the club in a 3–0 league win over Welling United on 15 August 2021, and scored his first goal for the club the club with a "towering header" in their following game, a 2–1 win away to Hampton & Richmond Borough on 22 August. In January 2022, it was announced that Adebowale had returned to Crawley, having made 8 appearances on loan at Havant.

On 9th February 2023, it was announced that Adebowale had left Crawley Town after agreeing to mutually terminate his contract with the club.

Career statistics

References

1997 births
Living people
English footballers
Footballers from Stratford, London
Association football defenders
Sheffield United F.C. players
West Ham United F.C. players
Goole A.F.C. players
Sheffield F.C. players
Hayes & Yeading United F.C. players
Bishop's Stortford F.C. players
Dover Athletic F.C. players
Crawley Town F.C. players
Havant & Waterlooville F.C. players
Eastbourne Borough F.C. players
Bognor Regis Town F.C. players
English Football League players
National League (English football) players
Southern Football League players
Northern Premier League players
Black British sportsmen